Nordstjärnans Tidsålder (English: Age of the Northern Star) is the debut studio album release by Swedish Viking metal band Månegarm. It was released in 1998. This album showcases Månegarm's more black metal style, with elements of folk metal and viking metal.

Track listing

External links
 Månegarm's official website

1998 debut albums
Månegarm albums